If I Had a Hammer is a 1999 film starring Susan Reno and Kristian Monday and written and directed by Josh Becker.

External links
If I Had a Hammer on Internet Movie Database

1999 films
American independent films
Films directed by Josh Becker
1990s English-language films
1990s American films